Hebei Circuit or Hebei Province was one of the major circuits during the Tang dynasty, Five Dynasties period, and early Song dynasty. During the Tang dynasty it was known as Hebei Dao, and during the Song dynasty Hebei Lu, but both dao and lu can be translated as "circuit". In 1042 it was divided into two circuits: Hebei East Circuit and Hebei West Circuit.

Its administrative area corresponds to roughly the modern provinces and cities of Beijing, Tianjin, and Hebei, as well as parts of northern Shandong and northern Henan. During the mid-Tang dynasty it also contained much of modern western Liaoning but that area was afterwards annexed by the Liao dynasty.

References
 

Circuits of the Song dynasty
Circuits of the Tang dynasty
Former circuits in Hebei
Former circuits in Shandong
Former circuits in Beijing
Former circuits in Tianjin